The Coral Cave is a marble cave at the northernmost tip of Jämtland, near Ankarvattnet, Sweden. It was discovered in 1985. So far, six kilometres of it have been explored, making it Sweden's longest cave. Members of the public are not allowed to visit the Coral Cave without a guide.

References

Caves of Sweden
Landforms of Jämtland County